Haplostachys (honohono) is a genus of flowering plants in the mint family, Lamiaceae, first described as a genus in 1888. The entire genus is endemic to the Hawaiian Islands, although 4 of the 5 known species that have been placed in the genus are now believed to be extinct, the fifth listed as "Critically Imperiled."

Species
†Haplostachys bryanii Sherff - Molokai but apparently extinct
Haplostachys haplostachya (A.Gray) H.St.John - Kauai, Maui, Hawaii; Critically Imperiled 
†Haplostachys linearifolia (Drake) Sherff - Maui, Molokai but apparently extinct on both islands
†Haplostachys munroi C.N.Forbes - Lanai but apparently extinct
†Haplostachys truncata (A.Gray) Hillebr. - Maui but apparently extinct

References

External links
Hawaiian Native Plant Genera
US Department of Agriculture plant profile
Floridata Flowering Plants of Hawaii, Part 23 Lamiaceae (Labiatae)

Lamiaceae
Lamiaceae genera
Endemic flora of Hawaii